Singiliomimus is a genus of beetles in the family Carabidae, containing the following species:

 Singiliomimus modestus Peringuey, 1896
 Singiliomimus posticallis Peringuey, 1896

References

Lebiinae